John Fort (died 1842) was a British industrialist and Whig politician who sat in the House of Commons from 1832 to 1841.

He was a wealthy partner in a Manchester calico textile printing firm (Fort Brothers) which had factories in Manchester and Oakenshaw, Lancashire. He was elected at the 1832 general election as the Member of Parliament (MP) for the borough of Clitheroe in Lancashire, and held that position until he stood down from Parliament at the 1841 general election.

His son Richard, who was High Sheriff of Lancashire in 1854 was M.P. for Clitheroe from 1865 to 1868.

References

External links 

Year of birth missing
1842 deaths
British industrialists
Whig (British political party) MPs for English constituencies
Members of the Parliament of the United Kingdom for English constituencies
UK MPs 1832–1835
UK MPs 1835–1837
UK MPs 1837–1841